Alan Otto Charles Verrinder (born 28 July 1955) is an English former cricketer. Verrinder played as a right-handed batsman who bowled right-arm fast-medium. He was born at Henley-on-Thames in Oxfordshire.

Verrinder made his first-class cricket debut for Surrey County Cricket Club against Middlesex in the 1974 County Championship. He made two further first-class appearances for Surrey, both in 1976, and played in three List A matches for the county.

Verrinder joined Kent in 1977, but made just a single first-class appearance against Cambridge University.

References

External links

1955 births
Living people
People from Henley-on-Thames
English cricketers
Surrey cricketers
Kent cricketers